Ephippiger is a bush cricket genus described by Berthold in 1827, belonging to the family Tettigoniidae, subfamily Bradyporinae and tribe Ephippigerini.

Description
 In this genus, the bush crickets have very small wings and the pronotum resembles a saddle (the Latin name ephippium means 'saddle of a horse').

The atrophied wings of Ephippiger species are unfit to flight and only used for the emission of sounds (stridulation).

Distribution
Species of this genus are mainly present in Austria, Belgium, Croatia, Czech Republic, France, Germany, Italy, Romania, Spain, Iran and Switzerland.

List of species 
 Ephippiger apulus (Ramme, 1933)
 Ephippiger bormansi Brunner von Wattenwyl, 1882
 Ephippiger camillae Fontana & Massa, 2000
 Ephippiger carlottae Fontana & Odé, 2003
 Ephippiger cavannai Targioni-Tozzetti, 1881
 Ephippiger cruciger (Fiebig, 1784)
 Ephippiger discoidalis Fieber, 1853
 Ephippiger diurnus Dufour, 1841
 Ephippiger ephippiger (Fiebig, 1784) - type species (as Gryllus ephippiger Fiebig = E. ephippiger ephippiger)
 Ephippiger mischtschenkoi Harz, 1966
 Ephippiger perforatus (Rossius, 1790)
 Ephippiger persicarius Fruhstorfer, 1921
 Ephippiger provincialis Yersin, 1854
 Ephippiger rugosicollis Serville
 Ephippiger ruffoi Galvagni, 1955
 Ephippiger terrestris Yersin, 1854
 Ephippiger tropicalis Baccetti, 1985
 Ephippiger zelleri Fischer, 1853

Gallery

References 
 Berthold, 1827 : ''Latreille's Naturliche Familien des Thierreichs / aus dem Franzosischen, mit Anmerkungen und Zusätzen, von Arnold Adolph Berthold (texte original).
 Michel Chinery, insectes de France 2005

External links 
 Ephippiger
 Biolib
 Fauna Europaea 

 
Tettigoniidae genera